The Story of A Fierce Bad Rabbit is a children’s book written and illustrated by Beatrix Potter, and first published by Frederick Warne & Co. in December 1906. The book tells of a bad little rabbit who forcefully takes another rabbit's carrot, but soon loses his tail and whiskers after being fired upon by a hunter. The book was intended for babies and very young children, and was originally published on a strip of paper that folded into a wallet and was tied with a ribbon. The format was unpopular with booksellers, and eventually reprinted in the standard small book format of the Peter Rabbit library.  Although the book sold well, there are not many left in existence. It provides the young child with an introduction to books and the Peter Rabbit universe.

Plot 
A bad rabbit finds a kindly rabbit sitting on a bench eating a carrot his mother gave him. Wanting the carrot, he takes it from the good rabbit and scratches him. Upset, the good rabbit escapes and hides in a nearby hole.  Meanwhile, a hunter notices the bad rabbit sitting on the bench and mistakes him for a bird. He fires at the bad rabbit, but finds nothing but a carrot and a rabbit tail on the bench.  The good rabbit then sees the bad rabbit running away without his whiskers and tail.

Composition and publication 

The Tale of A Fierce Bad Rabbit was written for Louie Warne, the daughter of Potter's publisher, Harold Warne.  The child thought Peter Rabbit much too well-behaved and wanted a story about a truly bad rabbit. Potter was experimenting with toy books at the time and A Fierce Bad Rabbit was published for Christmas 1906 in a panorama format of fourteen pictures and text printed from left to right on a long strip of paper that folded accordion-fashion into a wallet tied with a ribbon. The format was popular with readers but unpopular with booksellers who found the item too difficult to keep folded, tied, and in its place once curious customers opened and examined it.

In 1916, Potter completed a new frontispiece for the tale, and A Fierce Bad Rabbit was reprinted in a slightly smaller format than the other books in the Peter Rabbit library. Today, the book is printed in the standard small format of the series.

Critical commentaries 

Potter's three panorama books of 1906 – The Story of A Fierce Bad Rabbit, The Story of Miss Moppet, and The Sly Old Cat – are vignettes rather than the typical tales she produced of causality, extended plot, and variety of character.  Each story has a very limited cast of characters with one dominant character (the title character), and each is dependent upon an archetypal animosity: rabbit versus hunter and cat versus rodent.  In their simplicity and unusual format, these stories were intended for babies and very young children, but Potter was never at her best when writing for a clearly defined audience. A Fierce Bad Rabbit fails for this reason, and for its overt moralizing and stiff illustrations.  Most damaging to the book's success are the two rabbits. Both lack the adorable cuteness of Peter Rabbit and his kin.

A Fierce Bad Rabbit focuses on a traditional rather than a creative approach to storytelling and reflects Potter's inexperience with babies and very young children.  She appears to be more interested in naming and designating this or that rather than developing plot and exploring character. She names and directs the child's attention to the rabbit's tail, whiskers, and claws, for example, rather than to the animal's facial expression. When the hunter appears, he is blandly introduced with "This is a man with a gun." The gun goes off as expected with the stereotypical "BANG!" instead of a more creative onomatopoeia term Potter would have surely devised had she been writing this book for older children.

The panorama books are not Potter's best efforts, but do demonstrate her ability to pare text and illustrations to essentials.  She worked best, though, with more complicated plots and characters, and with specific settings rather than generalized backgrounds.  Her inexperience with babies and very young children is evident in the original panorama format itself, for a long strip of paper and a wallet are likely to be mutilated by the very young. The story in its current standard small book format of the Peter Rabbit series is considered to provide very young children with an introduction to books in general and to the world of Peter Rabbit.

The book is referenced in the final episode of To Play the King. The Prime Minister states that Britain is "a nation of fierce, bad rabbits," and that Potter, more than any other writer, influenced his personal prose style.

References 
Footnotes

Works cited

External links

The Story of a Fierce Bad Rabbit at University of Virginia Electronic Text Center
The Story of a Fierce Bad Rabbit at Internet Archive

1906 children's books
 British children's books
Peter Rabbit
Books about rabbits and hares
Frederick Warne & Co books